The church of Sant'Aponal is a deconsecrated Roman Catholic church in the sestiere of San Polo in Venice, Italy.

The church was founded in the 11th century, by refugees from Ravenna and dedicated to Apollinaris of Ravenna. Restored over the centuries, it underwent major reconstruction in the 15th century. During the Napoleonic occupation, it was deconsecrated and only reconsecrated in 1851. For a time it was used as a prison for political prisoners. It was re-closed in 1984, and is now mainly an archive. The facade retains bits of Gothic architecture decoration.

Sources
 Patriarch of Venice, entry on church
Guide d'Italia (serie Guide Rosse) - Venezia - Touring Club Italiano - pagg. 384-385 

Roman Catholic churches in Venice
15th-century Roman Catholic church buildings in Italy
Gothic architecture in Venice